Sandridge is a dispersed rural community to the east of Melksham, Wiltshire, England.  It is part of the civil parish of Melksham Without.

A National School was built in 1873 at Sandridge Common, on land given by Ralph Ludlow Lopes and educated children of all ages until 1953; around that time it became known as Forest and Sandridge Church of England Primary School. In 2015, to cater for the eastward expansion of Melksham, the school moved to a new building on the outskirts of the town.

Sandridge Park 
The two-storey house was built between 1856 and 1859 for Henry Lopes. After being used for a time as a hotel, it was sold in 2018 as an eight-bedroom house for £2.8m.

The former coach house and stables of the same date, now converted into a house, is Grade II listed. Further uphill on the other side of the road is Sandridge Tower, a former folly belonging to Sandridge Park, also now a house. Built in ashlar in the late 19th century, its four storeys are topped by a battlemented parapet.

References

External links
 
 

Melksham Without
Villages in Wiltshire